Los Angeles Jewish Home is a non-profit provider for senior healthcare services in Los Angeles, California. It is also commonly known as “the Jewish Home,” or simply “the Home.” Over the past century, the organisation has mainly focused on providing their healthcare services for the seniors throughout the greater Los Angeles area.

The Jewish Home's Reseda campuses offer independent living, residential care, skilled nursing care, short-term rehabilitation, and Alzheimer's disease and dementia care. The Home's Gonda Healthy Aging Westside Campus in Playa Vista offers independent living as well as assisted living and memory care.

History

On Passover, 1912, the Los Angeles Jewish Home began when a small group of neighbors gave shelter to five homeless Jewish men.

In 1916, the first permanent structure for the Home was purchased in the Boyle Heights section of downtown Los Angeles. The Jewish Home made plans for a facility in the San Fernando Valley of Los Angeles. This facility became known as the California Home for the Aged.

In the 1940s and 1950s, the Home built new facilities and senior residences in Reseda in the San Fernando Valley. The new site became known as the Grancell Village Campus.

In 1972, the California Home for the Aged was renamed Menorah Village. Four years later, the original Jewish Home for the Aged moved to a new location in the Reseda area of the San Fernando Valley. The two San Fernando Valley locations merged, becoming the Jewish Home for the Aging of greater Los Angeles and, ultimately, the Los Angeles Jewish Home.

Throughout the 1980s and 1990s, the Home constructed new clinics, residences, and facilities as the resident population grew. The Victory Boulevard Campus was named the Eisenberg Village Campus.

Expansions since 2000:

2002: Opening of the Goldenberg•Ziman Special Care Center for Alzheimer's disease and age-related dementia.

2004: Skirball Hospice began providing end-of-life care, and the Jewish Home Center for Palliative Medicine, focuses on the needs of those with chronic medical conditions.

2007: The Joyce Eisenberg-Keefer Medical Center on the Grancell Village Campus opened. The complex had an acute psychiatric hospital, 239 nursing beds, and a geriatric research center. 
 
2010: Opening of the Fountainview at Eisenberg Village, the Home's first Continuing Care Retirement Community (CCRC). The community has 108 residences for independent senior living.

Introduction of Jewish Home Care Services, a home health agency offering nursing, personal care assistance, and other assistance to seniors living at home.

2012: Brandman Centers for Senior Care (BCSC), a Program of All-inclusive Care for the Elderly (PACE), opened.

2017: Opening of the Gonda Healthy Aging Westside Campus featuring Fountainview at Gonda Westside, a CCRC community in the Playa Vista area of West Los Angeles. It contains 175 independent living Brandman Residences and 24 residential units for assisted living and memory care.

Services Currently Offered

Senior care services of the Los Angeles Jewish Home include:

Community-based Program of All-inclusive Care for the Elderly (PACE)
The Brandman Centers for Senior Care (BCSC) provide quality medical care that promotes independence for seniors through PACE, which
coordinates and provides all needed preventive, primary, acute, and long-term care services to older adults so they may live at home in their communities. The PACE model of care revolves around a fully integrated, interdisciplinary team of doctors, nurses, therapists, social workers, dietitians, drivers, and others who provide direct care and services to meet each program participant's needs.
 
Home Health
Registered nurses, vocational nurses and, certified home health aides are partnered with physical, occupational, and respiratory therapists to care for seniors within their home.

Skirball Hospice
Hospice provides end-of-life care to individuals with a life-limiting illness in their home or in the Jewish Home's Skirball Hospice.

Palliative Medicine
Palliative Medicine provides pain and symptom management for adults with chronic conditions.

Acute Psychiatric Care   
The Auerbach Geriatric Psychiatry Unit focuses on providing care for various conditions, such as bipolar disorder, depression, and schizophrenia.

Independent Living 
On site at the Jewish Home's Fountainview at Eisenberg Village in Reseda and the Fountainview at Gonda Westside in Playa Vista.

Assisted Living
On site at the Jewish Home's Reseda and Playa Vista campuses.

Residential Care
On site at the Jewish Home's Reseda campuses.

Skilled Nursing Care
On site at the Mark Taper Skilled Nursing Building, the Max Factor Family Foundation Building and the Joyce Eisenberg-Kiefer Medical Center on the Jewish Home's Reseda campuses.

Short-Term Rehabilitation
The Ida Kayne Transitional Care Unit helps seniors transition back to daily life after an illness, injury, medical procedure, or hospital stay.

Alzheimer's, Dementia, and Memory Care
The Goldenberg•Ziman Special Care Center provides nursing care for seniors with Alzheimer's disease and age-related dementia.

Annual Events

“World’s Largest” Mother's Day Celebration
The Los Angeles Jewish Home hosts a Mothers Day celebration each year for each mother, grandmother, great-grandmother and great-great-grandmother. The celebration began over two decades ago.

Celebration of Life: Reflections Gala
This is an annual event for the community which celebrates the leadership, donors and supporters of the Home's programs.

Longest Day of Golf
Annually, the Home asks those from the local community to participate in a day-long golfing event, to raise money for the home.

Sarnat Symposium for Geriatric Care
The Sarnat Symposium brings in speakers each year to share their insights, research findings, and experience with social workers and other professionals who care for seniors.

References

Notes
Abram, Susan, “A century of love and care celebrated at Los Angeles Jewish Home,” Los Angeles Daily News, January 8, 2012. https://www.dailynews.com/2012/01/08/a-century-of-love-and-care-celebrated-at-los-angeles-jewish-home/

Bartholomew, Dana, “Los Angeles Jewish Home in Reseda offering new medical care for seniors,” Los Angeles Daily News, March 19, 2013. https://www.dailynews.com/2013/03/19/los-angeles-jewish-home-in-reseda-offering-new-medical-care-for-seniors/

Berrin, Danielle, “Molly Forrest plans the future at the Los Angeles Jewish Home,” Jewish Journal, Oct 23, 2014. https://jewishjournal.com/cover_story/134353/

Day, Nellie, “Los Angeles Jewish Home Begins Constructions on $100M Fountainview at Gonda,” ReBusiness Online, September 12, 2014. https://rebusinessonline.com/los-angeles-jewish-home-begins-construction-on-100m-fountainview-at-gonda/

Eckerling, Debra L., “Temple Judea Students Enjoy ‘Respecting Elders’,” Jewish Journal, December 19, 2018. https://jewishjournal.com/news/los_angeles/community/291378/temple-judea-students-enjoy-respecting-elders/

Fountainview at Eisenberg Village. (n.d.) Continuing Care Retirement Community. Retrieved 1-2-19 from http://www.fountainviewjha.com/about/continuous-care-retirement

Fountainview at Gonda. (n.d.). Innovative and Luxurious Apartments for Independent Living. Retrieved 1-2-19 from http://www.fountainviewgonda.com/about-us/

Haynes, Karima A, “Jewish Home for the Aging Will Launch $72 Million Campaign,” Los Angeles Times, March 11, 2000. http://articles.latimes.com/2000/mar/11/local/me-7746

Healthcare for People. (n.d.). Jewish Home Care Services. Retrieved 1-2-19 from https://www.healthcare4ppl.com/home-health/california/encino/jewish-home-care-services-059170.html

Jewish Museum of the American West. (2018). The Los Angeles Jewish Home for the Aging began as the Hebrew Sheltering Society – 1908. Retrieved 1-2-19 from: http://www.jmaw.org/jewish-home-los-angeles/

Leading Age California. (Oct 5, 2011). Handy to Lecture at Los Angeles Jewish Home's 14th Annual Sarnat Symposium. Retrieved 1-3-19 from https://leadingageca.wordpress.com/2011/10/05/handy-to-lecture-at-los-angeles-jewish-homes-14th-annual-sarnat-symposium/

Los Angeles Jewish Home. (n.d.). Short-Term Rehabilitation. Retrieved 1-2-19 from http://www.lajh.org/care/place-to-live/short-term/ida-kayne-transitional-care-unit/

Los Angeles Jewish Home. (n.d.). Skilled Nursing. Retrieved 1-2-19 from http://www.lajh.org/care/place-to-live/long-term/skilled-nursing/

Nelson Hardiman. (n.d.) Events. Retrieved 1-3-19 from https://www.nelsonhardiman.com/events/senior-care-2028-whats-ahead-for-medicare-health-policy-and-delivery-of-care-for-aging-seniors/

PR Newswire. (Oct 13, 2015). Los Angeles Jewish Home to Honor CEO-President Molly Forrest at "Celebration of Life: Reflections 2015" Annual Gala. Retrieved 1-3-19 from https://www.prnewswire.com/news-releases/los-angeles-jewish-home-to-honor-ceo-president-molly-forrest-at-celebration-of-life-reflections-2015-annual-gala-300158924.html

Ritsch, Massie and Laura Loh, “A Big Day in the Sun for Southland Moms,” Los Angeles Times, May 13, 2002. http://articles.latimes.com/2002/may/13/local/me-mother13

Seniors Housing Business. (June 22, 2018). LeadingAge California Selects Los Angeles Jewish Home CEO Molly Forrest as Chair. Retrieved 1-3-19 from http://www.seniorshousingbusiness.com/the-latest-news/leadingage-california-selects-los-angeles-jewish-home-ceo-molly-forrest-as-chair

Skirball Hospice. (n.d.). Are You Considering Hospice Care? Retrieved 1-2-19 from http://skirballhospice.org/about/default.asp

Skirball Hospice. (n.d.). Skirball Hospice History. Retrieved 1-2-19 from http://skirballhospice.org/about/history.asp

Skirball Hospice. (n.d.). Palliative Medicine for Pain and Symptom Management. Retrieved 1-2-19 from http://skirballhospice.org/services/palliative-care.asp

Suffolk. (n.d.). Fountainview at Eisenberg Village. Retrieved 1-2-19 from https://www.suffolk.com/projects/fountainview-eisenberg-village-reseda-california

Torok, Ryan, “Moving & Shaking,” Jewish Journal, April 5, 2018. https://jewishjournal.com/news/los_angeles/moving-shaking/232783/moving-shaking-march-lives-big-brothers-seder/

Ward Biederman, Patricia, “Home Has Care in Mind,” Los Angeles Times, April 14, 2002. http://articles.latimes.com/2002/apr/14/local/me-memory14

Healthcare in Los Angeles
Medical and health organizations based in California
Nursing homes in the United States
1912 establishments in California
American companies established in 1912